Flying Eagle Preserve is located in Inverness, Florida in Citrus County, Florida and managed as part of the Southwest Florida Water Management District. The  park is located at 11080 East Moccasin Slough Road in Inverness, Florida and bounded on the east by the Withlacoochee River and is surrounded, in large part, by the Tsala Apopka Chain of Lakes. The preserve provides the setting for various aquatic and sporting activities.

McGregor Smith Scout Reservation was part of the preserve. The preserve also includes Withlapopka Community Park.

Withlapopka Community Park
Withlapopka Community Park is a 50-acre area that was used by Citrus County as a dumping site for spoil dredged from canals. It includes an unpaved loop trail (about a mile long) benches, picnic pavilion, picnic tables, and grills. It is used for frisbee golf (chipping and driving), horseshoes, tetherball and volleyball. There is also a swing and teeter-totter. It is located at 10390 East Gobbler Drive.

References

Protected areas of Citrus County, Florida
Southwest Florida Water Management District reserves